Laudelino José "Lino" de Barros (born June 29, 1975) is a Brazilian former professional boxer who competed from 2001 to 2016. As an amateur, he represented his native country in the light heavyweight division at the 2000 Summer Olympics. There he was eliminated in the first round by Australia's Danny Green. A year earlier, at the 1999 Pan American Games, Barros won the silver medal in his weight division.

In 2001 he turned pro.

References
UOL Esporte Profile
 
 sports-reference

1975 births
Living people
Sportspeople from Mato Grosso do Sul
Light-heavyweight boxers
Boxers at the 1999 Pan American Games
Pan American Games silver medalists for Brazil
Boxers at the 2000 Summer Olympics
Olympic boxers of Brazil
Brazilian male boxers
Pan American Games medalists in boxing
Medalists at the 1999 Pan American Games
20th-century Brazilian people
21st-century Brazilian people